Jake Garber (born April 16, 1965) is an American make-up artist who has done over 140 movies and television shows. For films he is most known for movies such as Star Trek: First Contact, Scream 3, Ghosts of Mars, Kill Bill, Hulk, Collateral, The Texas Chainsaw Massacre: The Beginning, The Hitcher, Grindhouse, The Mist, Inglourious Basterds, and Django Unchained (in which he also acted as a Candyland tracker). He has also done TV shows such as Star Trek: Voyager, Firefly, The Walking Dead and The X-Files.

He was nominated at the 69th Academy Awards for his work on the film Star Trek: First Contact, which was in the category of Best Makeup. He shared his nomination with Michael Westmore and Scott Wheeler.

He also has won three Emmy awards.

References

External links
 

Living people
1965 births
Artists from Saint Paul, Minnesota
American make-up artists